The Eperia estate is located in Peloponnese on the Argolis peninsula of Greece.

History

Eperia was established in Dardisa of Hermionis at the beginnings of the 1970s.
The most important event that connects Eperia's history to local history is that it was the first habituated place in Dardisa area during the modern era, after the abandon of Metallia village in 1968. With the establishment of Eperia started, the area of Dardisa became habituated and steadily formed a settlement made up mostly of holiday homes.

Etymology

The name Eperia is a hybrid word that derives from the ancient Greek word empiria (Greek:ἐμπειρία) and the Latin word experimentia, both literally meaning "the knowledge that comes from situations". The Greek/Latin word was created as a toponym-hybrid word by the family owning Eperia over to describe how many experiences have and can be acquired from the free time at Eperia's estate.

External links
 A Greek Countryside
 *http://www.perseus.tufts.edu/hopper/text?doc=Perseus:text:1999.04.0059:entry=experientia
 *http://www.perseus.tufts.edu/hopper/text?doc=Perseus:text:1999.04.0057:entry=e)mpeiri/a

Landmarks in Greece
Argolis